This is a list of 155 species in Limnebius, a genus of minute moss beetles in the family Hydraenidae.

Limnebius species

 Limnebius acupunctus Perkins, 2004 i c g
 Limnebius aguilerai Ribera and Millán, 1998 i c g
 Limnebius alibeii Hernando, Aguilera and Ribera, 1999 i c g
 Limnebius alluaudi Orchymont, 1948 i c g
 Limnebius almoranus Knisch, 1924 i c g
 Limnebius aluta Bedel, 1881 i c g
 Limnebius alutaceus (Casey, 1886) i c g b
 Limnebius angulatus Perkins, 2017 g
 Limnebius angustipennis Orchymont, 1932 i c g
 Limnebius angustulus (Casey, 1886) i c g
 Limnebius apolloniae Jäch and Delgado, 2013 i c g
 Limnebius arabicus Balfour-Browne, 1951 i c g
 Limnebius arenicolus Perkins, 1980 i c g
 Limnebius aridus Perkins, 1980 i c g
 Limnebius asperatus Knisch, 1922 i c g
 Limnebius atomus (Duftschmid, 1805) i c g
 Limnebius attalensis Jäch, 1993 i c g
 Limnebius bacchus Balfour-Browne, 1978 i c g
 Limnebius balkei Perkins, 2017 g
 Limnebius bergsteni Perkins, 2017 g
 Limnebius borealis Perkins, 1980 i c g
 Limnebius boukali Jäch, 1993 i c g
 Limnebius calabricus Jäch, 1993 i c g
 Limnebius canariensis Orchymont, 1938 i c g
 Limnebius capensis Perkins, 2015 i c g
 Limnebius championi Balfour-Browne, 1956 i c g
 Limnebius clandestinus Perkins, 2017 g
 Limnebius clavatus Pu, 1951 i c g
 Limnebius claviger Jäch, 1993 i c g
 Limnebius clayae Balfour-Browne, 1956 i c g
 Limnebius conoideus Régimbart, 1905 i c g
 Limnebius convexus Perkins, 2015 i c g
 Limnebius cordobanus Orchymont, 1938 i c g
 Limnebius corfidius Orchymont, 1945 i c g
 Limnebius corybus Orchymont, 1945 i c g
 Limnebius crassipes Kuwert, 1890 i c g
 Limnebius crinifer Rey, 1885 i c g
 Limnebius cruzei Jäch, 1982 i c g
 Limnebius cupulifer Orchymont, 1941 i c g
 Limnebius curidius Orchymont, 1941 i c g
 Limnebius damasi Balfour-Browne, 1950 i c g
 Limnebius dioscoridus Jäch and Delgado, 2012 i c g
 Limnebius discolor Casey, 1900 i c g
 Limnebius distinctus Knisch, 1924 i c g
 Limnebius distinguendus Ferro, 1989 i c g
 Limnebius doderoi Gridelli, 1926 i c g
 Limnebius endroedyi Perkins, 2015 i c g
 Limnebius evanescens Kiesenwetter, 1866 i c g
 Limnebius extraneus Orchymont, 1938 i c g
 Limnebius fallaciosus Ganglbauer, 1904 i c g
 Limnebius ferroi Jäch, 1993 i c g
 Limnebius feuerborni Orchymont, 1932 i c g
 Limnebius fontinalis Balfour-Browne, 1951 i c g
 Limnebius fretalis Peyerimhoff, 1913 i c g
 Limnebius furcatus Baudi, 1872 i c g
 Limnebius gerhardti Heyden, 1870 i c g
 Limnebius glabriventris Shatrovskiy, 1989 i c g
 Limnebius gracilipes Wollaston, 1864 i c g
 Limnebius graecus Jäch, 1993 i c g
 Limnebius grandicollis Wollaston, 1854 i c g
 Limnebius gridellii Pretner, 1929 i c g
 Limnebius hieronymi Vorst, 2006 i c g
 Limnebius hilaris Balfour-Browne, 1978 i c g
 Limnebius hispanicus Orchymont, 1941 i c g
 Limnebius ibericus Balfour-Browne, 1978 i c g
 Limnebius ignarus Balfour-Browne, 1978 i c g
 Limnebius immersus Knisch, 1926 i c g
 Limnebius irmelae Jäch, 1993 i c g
 Limnebius javanus Orchymont, 1932 i c g
 Limnebius jeanneli Orchymont, 1948 i c g
 Limnebius kamali Sáinz-Cantero and Bennas, 2006 i c g
 Limnebius kaszabi Chiesa, 1967 i c g
 Limnebius kavango Perkins, 2015 i c g
 Limnebius kelaniyae Jäch, 1982 i c g
 Limnebius kocheri Balfour-Browne, 1978 i c g
 Limnebius kwangdongensis Pu, 1937 g
 Limnebius kwangtungensis Pu, 1936 i c g
 Limnebius kweichowensis Pu, 1951 i c g
 Limnebius labratus Perkins, 2017 g
 Limnebius lacrimosus Perkins, 2017 g
 Limnebius leachi Orchymont, 1932 i c g
 Limnebius leechi Perkins, 1980 i c g
 Limnebius levantinus Jäch, 1993 i c g
 Limnebius lobatus Perkins, 2017 g
 Limnebius loeblorum Jäch, 1993 i c g
 Limnebius lusitanus Balfour-Browne, 1978 i c g
 Limnebius masculinus Perkins, 2015 i c g
 Limnebius maurus Balfour-Browne, 1978 i c g
 Limnebius maximadus Perkins, 2017 g
 Limnebius mesatlanticus Théry, 1933 i c g
 Limnebius mexicanus Perkins, 1980 i c g
 Limnebius millani Ribera and Hernando, 1998 i c g
 Limnebius minoricensis Jäch, Valladares and García-Avilés, 1996 i c g
 Limnebius mitus Perkins, 1980 i c g
 Limnebius monfortei Fresneda & Ribera, 1998 g
 Limnebius montanus Balfour-Browne, 1978 i c g
 Limnebius mucronatus Baudi, 1872 i c g
 Limnebius mundus Baudi, 1864 i c g
 Limnebius murcus Orchymont, 1945 i c g
 Limnebius murentius Orchymont, 1945 i c g
 Limnebius mutatus Orchymont, 1945 i c g
 Limnebius myrmidon Rey, 1883 i c g
 Limnebius nakanei Jäch and Matsui, 1994 i c g
 Limnebius nanostillus Perkins, 2017 g
 Limnebius nanus Jäch, 1993 i c g
 Limnebius nigritus Balfour-Browne, 1956 i c g
 Limnebius nitiduloides Baudi, 1872 i c g
 Limnebius nitidus (Marsham, 1802) i c g
 Limnebius nitifarus Orchymont, 1938 i c g
 Limnebius nitigeus Orchymont, 1945 i c g
 Limnebius oblongus Rey, 1883 i c g
 Limnebius octolaevis Perkins, 1980 i c g
 Limnebius ordunyai Fresneda & Ribera, 1998 g
 Limnebius oweni Jäch and Delgado, 2013 i c g
 Limnebius ozapalachicus Perkins, 1980 i c g
 Limnebius paganettii Ganglbauer, 1904 i c g
 Limnebius papposus Mulsant, 1844 i c g
 Limnebius paranuristanus Ferro, 1989 i c g
 Limnebius parvulus (Herbst, 1797) i c g
 Limnebius perparvulus Rey, 1884 i c g
 Limnebius piceus (Horn, 1872) i c g
 Limnebius pilicauda Guillebeau, 1896 i c g
 Limnebius pollex Jäch and Delgado, 2013 i c g
 Limnebius probus Perkins, 2015 i c g
 Limnebius punctatus Wollaston, 1864 i c g
 Limnebius quantillus Perkins, 2015 i c g
 Limnebius retiolus Perkins, 2015 i c g
 Limnebius reuvenortali Jäch, 1993 i c g
 Limnebius richmondi Perkins, 1980 i c g
 Limnebius rubropiceus Kuwert, 1890 i c g
 Limnebius rufipennis Régimbart, 1903 i c g
 Limnebius sanctimontis Jäch, 1993 i c g
 Limnebius schoenmanni Jäch, 1993 i c g
 Limnebius setifer Khnzorian, 1962 i c g
 Limnebius shatrovskiyi Jäch, 1993 i c g
 Limnebius similis Wollaston, 1865 i c g
 Limnebius simplex Baudi, 1882 i c g
 Limnebius simulans Orchymont, 1940 i c g
 Limnebius sinuatus (Sharp, 1882) i c g
 Limnebius speculus Perkins, 2015 i c g
 Limnebius spinosus Jäch, 1993 i c g
 Limnebius stagnalis Guillebeau, 1890 i c g
 Limnebius steineri Perkins, 2017 g
 Limnebius suaviculus Perkins, 2015 i c g
 Limnebius taiwanensis Jäch, 1993 i c g
 Limnebius texanus Perkins, 1980 i c g
 Limnebius theryi Guillebeau, 1891 i c g
 Limnebius thienemanni Orchymont, 1932 i c g
 Limnebius transversus Perkins, 2015 i c g
 Limnebius truncatellus (Thunberg, 1794) i c g
 Limnebius utahensis Perkins, 1980 i c g
 Limnebius vinsoni Orchymont, 1941 i c g
 Limnebius wittei Balfour-Browne, 1950 i c g
 Limnebius wui Pu, 1942 i c g
 Limnebius zaerensis Hernando, Aguilera and Ribera, 2008 i c g

Data sources: i = ITIS, c = Catalogue of Life, g = GBIF, b = Bugguide.net

References

Limnebius
Articles created by Qbugbot